The England women's cricket team played the Pakistan women's cricket team in Malaysia in December 2019. The tour consisted of three Women's One Day Internationals (WODIs), which formed part of the 2017–20 ICC Women's Championship, and three Women's Twenty20 Internationals (WT20Is). All of the matches were played at the Kinrara Oval in Kuala Lumpur. Pakistan have played England eight times previously in WODI matches, without recording a win. In WT20Is, the teams have faced each other ten times previously, with England winning nine of those matches.

Pakistan had previously played a home series in Malaysia as part of the 2017–20 ICC Women's Championship, against Australia, in October 2018. Ahead of the tour, the Pakistan Cricket Board (PCB) confirmed that Bismah Maroof would continue as captain of the team for the matches. Sana Mir, Pakistan's most capped player in women's cricket, announced that she had taken a break from international cricket, and missed the tour.

England won the WODI series, after taking an unassailable lead with wins in the first two matches. The final match finished as a no result due to rain, therefore England won the series 2–0. England also won the first two WT20I matches to secure a series win. England won the third and final match by 24 runs to win the series 3–0.

Squads

WODI series

1st WODI

2nd WODI

3rd WODI

WT20I series

1st WT20I

2nd WT20I

3rd WT20I

References

External links
 Series home at ESPN Cricinfo

2019 in women's cricket
2017–20 ICC Women's Championship
2019 in English cricket
2019 in Pakistani cricket
International cricket competitions in 2019–20
Pakistan 2019-20